Jesus Goyzueta (born 1 January 1947) is a Peruvian football goalkeeper who played for Peru in the 1970 FIFA World Cup. He also played for Universitario de Deportes.

References

External links
FIFA profile

1947 births
Peruvian footballers
Peru international footballers
Association football goalkeepers
Club Universitario de Deportes footballers
1970 FIFA World Cup players
Living people